Michele Fini (born 14 June 1974) is an Italian football coach and former player.

Playing career 
Fini was born in Sorso, Province of Sassari. A midfielder, started his career at Sardinian clubs. In summer 1995 he was signed by Ancona. In January 1998 he was signed by Salernitana of Serie B. Fini's debut in Serie A and last match for Salernitana was on 26 September 1998 in a match against Udinese the score was 2–0.

He was transferred to Cagliari from Ascoli Calcio 1898 in 2007, signed a two-year deal. He scored six  goals in sixty six appearances in his time at the club. On 9 July 2009, A.C. Siena signed the midfielder from Cagliari Calcio on a two-year deal. After his spell at Siena, Fini returned to his home province of Sassari and spent the remainder of his career playing for Serie D side A.C. Porto Torres. He formally retired in July 2014 at the age of 40 to take up the assistant manager position at Bologna F.C.

Managerial career 
On 3 July 2014, Bologna manager Luis Diego López appointed Fini as the club's assistant manager. Fini departed the club the following year after López's removal.

In January 2017 he was appointed as a member of Palermo's technical staff, a position which he left in October of that year to rejoin López as assistant manager, this time at his former club Cagliari. Fini followed López, with whom he moved to López homeland, Uruguay, in early June 2018, joining Peñarol. Starting from five points behind arch-rivals Club Nacional de Football, they led the club to a league title by beating that adversary 1–0 in the final. After losing by the same margin to Nacional in the next edition, López announced his exit in December 2019 together with his staff, including Fini.

On 5 February 2020, Fini and López returned to Serie A, signing with second-from-bottom Brescia Calcio after the dismissal of Eugenio Corini. López and Fini was fired on 20 August 2020. However, they were hired again on 6 October 2020. Two months later, the duo was fired for the second time.

Honours
Salernitana
Serie B: 1997–98

Ascoli
Serie B promotion to Serie A: 2004–05

Catania
Serie C1 promotion Serie B playoff: 2001–02

Peñarol
Uruguayan Championship Championship: 2018

Individual
Serie A top assist provider: 2008–09 (13 assists)

References

Sources

gazzetta.it

1974 births
Living people
People from Sorso
Italian footballers
Serie A players
Serie B players
A.C. Ancona players
U.S. Salernitana 1919 players
Cosenza Calcio 1914 players
U.S. Avellino 1912 players
Catania S.S.D. players
Ascoli Calcio 1898 F.C. players
Cagliari Calcio players
Association football midfielders
Footballers from Sardinia
S.E.F. Torres 1903 players